The FIBA Asia Under-18 Championship 2006 is the 2006 edition of the International Basketball Federation FIBA Asia's youth championship for basketball. The games were held at Urumqi, China

The top 3 teams qualified for the 2007 FIBA Under-19 World Championship.

Draw

Preliminary round

Group A

Group B

Group C

Group D

Quarterfinal round

Group I

Group II

Group III

Group IV

Classification 9th–14th

15th place

13th place

11th place

9th place

Classification 5th–8th

Semifinals

7th place

5th place

Final round

Semifinals

3rd place

Final

Final standing

Awards

External links
Fiba Asia
http://www.jabba-net.com

FIBA Asia Under-18 Championship
2006–07 in Asian basketball
2006–07 in Chinese basketball
International basketball competitions hosted by China
September 2006 sports events in Asia